Baumgarten bei Gnas is part of the municipality Gnas in the Austrian state of Styria.  
 Prior to the 2015 Styria municipal structural reform, it was a municipality in the district of Südoststeiermark.

Population

References

Cities and towns in Südoststeiermark District